Mildred Farris (August 8, 1933 – May 13, 2013) is a ProRodeo Hall of Fame inductee, who was inducted with her husband John.

Life
Mildred Farris was born Mildred Lois Cotten in Andrews, Texas, on August 8, 1933. She worked on her father's cattle ranch. She graduated from Sul Ross State University in Alpine, Texas, with a B.A. in Physical Education in 1955. She attended a rodeo reunion where she met John Farris, and the two were married in May 1955.

Career
Farris is a five-time National Finals Rodeo (NFR) secretary. She is a five-time NFR assistant secretary. She is an eight-time Professional Rodeo Cowboys Association (PRCA) Secretary of the Year. She is a PRCA Contract Personnel Executive Council from 1988-2002. She carried the American flag at NFR opening in Oklahoma City, Oklahoma, for 17 years. She qualified for the NFR 12 times as a barrel racer. She served as the Girls Rodeo Association (GRA) and also served when it was renamed the Women's Professional Rodeo Association (WPRA) director. She also served as its vice-president, and president from 1965-1971.

From 1955 to 1957, Farris was the Texas Barrel Racing Association's champion barrel racing. She was the runner-up to the World Barrel Racing Champion at the NFR in 1959, 1960, and 1969. In 1968, she ran the fastest time at the NFR. Farris attended Sul Ross University and graduated in 1955. She also served as secretary to many producers including Tommy Steiner, Harper and Morgan, Neal Gay, the Fort Worth Stock Show and others.

She also served as the secretary for the Dodge (now RAM) Texas Circuit Finals for 17 years. She was the WPRA Secretary of the Year in 1998. She was the WPRA Woman of the Year in 1996.

Honors
 1994 Sul Ross Rodeo Hall of Fame
 2004 Texas Rodeo Cowboy Hall of Fame
 2010 Rodeo Hall of Fame of the National Cowboy & Western Heritage Museum
 2012 National Cowgirl Museum and Hall of Fame

Death
Farris died on May 13, 2013, in Addington, Oklahoma.

References

Bibliography

External links 
 Women's Professional Rodeo Association
 Professional Rodeo Cowboys Association
 National Finals Rodeo

1933 births
2013 deaths
People from Andrews, Texas
People from Alpine, Texas
American barrel racers
American female equestrians
Cowgirl Hall of Fame inductees
ProRodeo Hall of Fame inductees
21st-century American women